Blanton is an unincorporated community in Lowndes County, in the U.S. state of Georgia.

History
Blanton was laid out in 1896, and named after J. N. Blanton, an original owner of the site. A post office called Blanton was established in 1899, and remained in operation until 1918. A variant name was "Blanton Station". In 1900, the community had 88 inhabitants.

References

Unincorporated communities in Lowndes County, Georgia